Aaj Ka Goonda Raaj is a 1992 Indian Hindi-language action crime film starring Chiranjeevi, Meenakshi Sheshadri in lead roles. It is a remake of the 1991 Telugu film Gang Leader. This was Chiranjeevi's second film in Bollywood. The film explores the concepts of exploitation by anti-social elements and the impact of crowd psychology.

Plot
Raja is portrayed as educated, righteous, honest, challenging, and a daredevil who is unemployed. With no work on hand, he spends his time with his four friends. This upsets his dad and elder brothers Amar and Ravi, who worry about him.

Troubled by a lack of money, the family has many problems. Ravi's pending IAS examination requires money they do not have. To raise money, Raja and his friends take a job getting rid of a Shalu, a tenant who has illegally settled in a house. Raja has an easy time getting rid of Shalu. But from then on, Shalu creates hell for him and moves into his house and life permanently. 

Tejpal and Nagpal are power brokers. They succeed in getting Ritu married to Ravi, now an IAS officer, who is about to become a collector. The villains think that this was a perfect strategy: Saxena's sister married to Raja's brother. Raja revolts but is cornered. He has many clashes with the duo. In one of these clashes, Raja's friends and eldest brother Amar are murdered. All is lost until Raja and Ravi discover the truth about Tejpal and Nagpal. Raja and Ravi decide to end the Gundaraj.

Cast

 Chiranjeevi as Raja 
 Meenakshi Sheshadri as Shalu 
 Raj Babbar as Ravi
 Parikshit Sahni as Amar
 Prem Chopra as Tejpal
 Sharat Saxena as Nagpal
 Dalip Tahil as SP Shivendranath Saxena
 Satish Shah as Jailor
 Tinu Anand as Home Minister
 Dina Pathak as Daadi Maa
 Rakesh Bedi as Govind Ahuja "Guddu"
 Geetha as Ritu 
 Sudha as Aarti
 Ravi Teja as Raja's Friend
 Dinesh Kaushik as Raja's Friend
 Dan Dhanoa as Corrupt Police Inspector
 Kunika as Chanda
 Anees Bazmee as Anees

Soundtrack
The album featured hit songs composed by Anand–Milind and written by Sameer. The album managed top sales in 1992.

References

External links
 

1992 films
1990s Hindi-language films
Films scored by Anand–Milind
Hindi remakes of Telugu films
Films set in Hyderabad, India
Films shot in Hyderabad, India
Indian crime drama films
1990s action drama films
Indian crime action films
Fictional portrayals of the Maharashtra Police
1990s crime action films
Films about corruption in India
Social realism in film
Law enforcement in fiction
Indian action drama films
Indian gangster films
Films directed by Ravi Raja Pinisetty
1992 drama films
Hindi-language crime films